Linda Otto (April 4, 1940 – June 27, 2004) was a producer and casting director as well as a director. She was active from the 1970s to the early 2000s.

Biography

Early life
Linda Otto was born on April 4, 1940.

Career
As a casting director her early work included House Of Dark Shadows in 1970 and Night of Dark Shadows in 1971. Later, her casting credits included shows, Mary Tyler Moore Show, Rhoda, Charlie's Angels etc.

In the late 1970s, she worked for her husband's company she was a producer and director. As a producer some of her work included Torn Between Two Lovers in 1979, the TV movie, A Long Way Home in 1981, The Jayne Mansfield Story in 1980. She produced multiple features throughout the 1980s. In 1990, she had a part in the made-for-television movie Crash: The Mystery of Flight 1501, where she played the part of Harriet. Her final production work was The Lottery, Country Justice in 1997 and finally the documentary Living Dolls: The Making of a Child Beauty Queen in 2001.

Shortly before her death, she produced a documentary called  Destined to Live, drawing upon the experiences of cancer survivors and her own.

Personal life
She married Alan Landsburg in 1976. They resided in Beverly Hills, California.

Later years
She died in Los Angeles on June 27, 2004, aged 64. She was survived by her husband, two daughters and a son.

Director

Movies
 Unspeakable Acts -(TV) – 1990
 A Mother's Right: The Elizabeth Morgan Story (TV) – 1993
 Not in My Family (TV) – 1993
 Gregory K (TV) – 1993

Documentary
America Undercover (TV series documentary) – 1992

Producer

Movies
 Country Justice (TV) – 1997
 1996 The Lottery (TV) – 1996
 Gregory K (TV) – 1993
 In Defense of a Married Man (TV) – 1990
 The Ryan White Story (TV) – 1989
 Quiet Victory: The Charlie Wedemeyer Story (TV) - 1988
 Strange Voices (TV) – 1987
 The George McKenna Story (TV) – 1986
 Adam: His Song Continues (TV) – 1986
 Bill: On His Own (TV) 1983
 Adam (TV) – 1983
 A Long Way Home (TV) – 1981
 The Jayne Mansfield Story (TV) – 1980
 Marathon (TV) – 1980
 Torn Between Two Lovers (TV) – 1979

Documentary
 Living Dolls: The Making of a Child Beauty Queen (TV)- 2001

Executive producer

Movies
 If Someone Had Known (TV) – 1995
 A Mother's Right: The Elizabeth Morgan Story (TV) – 1992
 Unspeakable Acts (TV) – 1992

Associate producer

Movies
 A Place at the Table (TV) – 1988

References

1940 births
2004 deaths
People from Beverly Hills, California
Film producers from California
Film directors from Los Angeles
American women film producers
American women film directors
American casting directors
Women casting directors